The Westchester Indians were an American basketball team based in White Plains, New York that was a member of the American Basketball League.

During the 1944/45 season, the team became the New York Gothams on January 20, 1945.

Year-by-year

Basketball teams in New York (state)
White Plains, New York
Defunct basketball teams in the United States
Sports in Westchester County, New York
Basketball teams in the New York metropolitan area